Neslandsvatn is a small village in Drangedal with a population of 1262. It is also a station on the Sørlandet Line. It is a popular skiing and snowboarding area.

Villages in Vestfold og Telemark
Drangedal